Brainard township is a township in Brown County, South Dakota, United States. As of the 2020 census it had a population of 114.

Geography 
Brainard township has an elavation of 1316 feet

References 

Townships in Brown County, South Dakota
Townships in South Dakota